Morningside Historic District is a national historic district located at Gary, Indiana.  The district is characterized by spacious lots and tree-shaded curving streets.  It encompasses 99 contributing buildings and 1 contributing site.

Morningside developed early in the 20th century as a secluded area for middle and upper class residents. Construction in the neighborhood spanned nearly 40 years – from 1917 to 1953 – creating an architectural collection ranging from English cottages and Tudor Revival style manors to post-war ranch houses. The area was named to the National Register of Historic Places by the Partners in Preservation program. Funded by local preservation advocate Jim Morrow, the program pays for professional preparation of National Register nominations for qualifying structures in Lake and Porter counties.

It was listed in the National Register of Historic Places in 2009.

References

External links
 Morningside Historic District website

Historic districts on the National Register of Historic Places in Indiana
Colonial Revival architecture in Indiana
Tudor Revival architecture in Indiana
Neighborhoods in Gary, Indiana
Historic districts in Gary, Indiana
National Register of Historic Places in Gary, Indiana